Samet Bülbül (born 13 March 1991) is a Turkish professional footballer who currently plays as an attacking midfielder for Çatalcaspor. His height is 1m 76cms.

Career
Born in Beykoz, Samet began his career with local club Ortaçeşme in 2001. He played for Beşiktaş' youth sides until 2010 when he signed a professional contract with the club.

References

External links
Samet Bülbül at TFF

1991 births
Living people
Turkish footballers
Beşiktaş J.K. footballers
Bucaspor footballers
Şanlıurfaspor footballers
Nazilli Belediyespor footballers
Süper Lig players
Turkey youth international footballers
People from Beykoz
Footballers from Istanbul
Association football midfielders